Victor Peytral (1876-1954) was a French politician. He served as a member of the National Assembly of France from 1912 to 1919 and as French Senator from 1920 to 1930. He also served as Under-Secretary of the Interior from September 12, 1917, to November 16, 1917, and as Minister of Public Works from June 14, 1924, to April 17, 1925.

Biography
Victor Peytral was born on October 18, 1874, in Marseille, Bouches-du-Rhône, France.

He served as a member of the National Assembly of France from 1912 to 1919 and as French Senator from 1920 to 1930. He also served as Under-Secretary of the Interior from September 12, 1917, to November 16, 1917, and as Minister of Public Works from June 14, 1924, to April 17, 1925.

He died on April 19, 1964, in Draguignan, Var, France.

References

1876 births
1964 deaths
Politicians from Marseille
Radical Party (France) politicians
French Ministers of Public Works
Members of the 10th Chamber of Deputies of the French Third Republic
Members of the 11th Chamber of Deputies of the French Third Republic
French Senators of the Third Republic
Senators of Hautes-Alpes